Kevin J. Doyle is a United States magistrate judge of the United States District Court for the District of Vermont. He succeeded John M. Conroy in February 2021. Doyle was the first Assistant United States Attorney for the state of Vermont before becoming a judge.

Biography 
Doyle was born in Brooklyn, New York, on August 18th, 1974. He was raised in Staten Island NY, and attended Regis High School in Manhattan. After high school Doyle received a Bachelor of Arts degree in classics and classical languages, literatures, and linguistics from Georgetown University in 1996. After teaching at Regis High School and St. Peter's Preparatory School, he earned a Juris Doctor from Seton Hall University School of Law in 2003.

After graduating from Seton Hall Law, Doyle served as a Judicial Law Clerk in: The District of Vermont (2003-2004), The District of New Jersey (2004-2005), and The United States Court of Appeals for the Second Circuit (2005-2006). He then worked for Marino Tortorella PC in Chatham, New Jersey as an attorney in complex civil litigation and white collar criminal defense practice.

Doyle joined the U.S. Attorney’s Office in the District of Vermont in 2007. He served in the Civil Division for four years and in the Criminal Division for seven years. In 2018, he was promoted to First Assistant United States Attorney, where he managed the day-to-day operations of the Vermont U.S. Attorney’s Office. Doyle taught substantive criminal law and criminal procedure as an adjunct professor at Norwich University from 2017 to 2020. He also taught criminal law as an adjunct professor at Vermont Law School from 2020 to 2021.

Upon the retirement of The Honorable John M. Conroy, Doyle was appointed magistrate judge of The District Court for the District of Vermont in February 2021. Doyle has since become an elected member of the American Law Institute.

References

External links 

 Kevin J. Doyle at Ballotpedia
 Kevin J. Doyle at American Law Institute

1974 births
Living people
United States magistrate judges
Lawyers from Brooklyn
Georgetown College (Georgetown University) alumni
Seton Hall University School of Law alumni
Norwich University faculty
Vermont Law and Graduate School faculty
Members of the American Law Institute